Cream Soda and Milk is a film made in Hong Kong in 1981 about the social problems and broken families of that period.  The name itself is inspired by the drink cream soda with milk that was popular in the 1970s. Actress Deanie Ip won the 19th Golden Horse Awards as Best Supporting Actress.

Plot
Ling's parents were separated when she was young and she went abroad with her mother. Her brother Ding spends time in the youth detention centers and prisons of Hong Kong. Ling misses her brother and when she returns to Hong Kong she seeks her boyfriend Yeung’s help to look for her brother and father. Yeung is a social worker and one day he sees a youngster who looks like Ling's brother and loves drinking cream soda and milk. Nevertheless, Ding doesn't want to meet his sister.

Cast
 Eddie Chan as  Sunny Yang
 Lee Yin-yin as Ting Ling
 Deannie Ip as Aunt Y 
 Yim Chau-wah as Ting Tien Sheng / Ting Dong 
 Chan On-ying as Mei A Hua
Wu Fung as Ting Sung Sheng

References 

1981 films
Hong Kong drama films
1980s Cantonese-language films